Richard Allen Burks (July 27, 1960 – February 19, 1989) was an American musician and actor. Burks was born in Oakland, California. He is most notable for his portrayal of Michael Tutman in the 1987 horror/comedy film Blood Diner produced by Jimmy Maslon and directed by Jackie Kong.

He also made a minor appearance in the 1987 film The Underachievers and the 1988 film Wicked Stepmother.  He was also in numerous music videos; David Bowie's "Day-In Day-Out", Brenda Russell's "Piano In The Dark", Gladys Knight's "Livin on Next to Nothin", and Neil Young's "Hey Hey, My My".

Burks died at Cedars Sinai Hospital in 1989 after his friend/drummer in their underground band got drunk and hit a tree and then a pole on Wilshire and Beverly in Hollywood.

External links 

1960 births
1989 deaths
Male actors from California
Road incident deaths in California
20th-century American male actors